BizTech is an American based online quarterly magazine that focuses on advanced technology inside U.S. businesses and nonprofit organizations.

Content
BizTech explores the nexus of business and technology, with a focus on technologies that U.S. businesses commonly deploy to drive growth and efficiency. The magazine frequently covers topics such as data center deployments, cybersecurity, advanced collaboration and digital workspace technologies, cloud technologies, networking technologies and other topics surrounding the digital transformation of businesses.

Publishing
BizTech is published by CDW, a multibrand technology provider headquartered in Vernon Hills, IL. The inaugural issue  was released in March 2005. The magazine is published quarterly with a circulation of approximately 85,000 in the United States.

References

Online magazines published in the United States
Quarterly magazines published in the United States
Science and technology magazines published in the United States
Magazines established in 2005
Magazines published in Illinois
2005 establishments in Illinois